The Hundred of Santo is a cadastral hundred of the County of Cardwell (South Australia), centred on the rural locality of Salt Creek, South Australia. It was proclaimed by Governor Dominick Daly in 1864 and named for Philip Santo, a member of the South Australian parliament in the 1860s and 1870s.

The Hundred is located in the Limestone Coast south east of Adelaide, South Australia.

References

Santo